Station Avenue Business District is a historic district located in Haddon Heights, Camden County, New Jersey, United States. The district goes from 8th Avenue to the White Horse Pike, along Station Avenue and was added to the National Register of Historic Places on November 13, 1989.

See also
National Register of Historic Places listings in Camden County, New Jersey
Haddon Heights, New Jersey

References

External links
Living Places Station_Avenue Business District

Haddon Heights, New Jersey
Historic districts in Camden County, New Jersey
National Register of Historic Places in Camden County, New Jersey
Historic districts on the National Register of Historic Places in New Jersey
New Jersey Register of Historic Places